Paštrović is a Croatian, Montenegrin and Serbian surname, which may refer to:
Borko Paštrović (1875–1912), Serbian military commander 
Stefan Paštrović, 16th-century hieromonk of the Serbian Orthodox Church

Croatian surnames
Montenegrin surnames
Serbian surnames